Winterthur Hegi railway station is a railway station in the municipality of Winterthur, in the Swiss canton of Zürich. It is an intermediate stop on the standard gauge St. Gallen–Winterthur line of Swiss Federal Railways.

Services 
The following services stop at Winterthur Hegi:

References

External links 
 
 

Railway stations in the canton of Zürich
Swiss Federal Railways stations
Transport in Winterthur